Sheffield City Trust is a registered charity in the United Kingdom that owns and/or manages twelve entertainment and sports venues in Sheffield, South Yorkshire, England.

Charitable objectives

The Trust was established in 1988 with three charitable objects:

provide recreational and other leisure facilities of a high standard and as economically as possible
promote the physical health of the inhabitants of the City of Sheffield
encouragement of the Arts, and the acquisition, preservation, restoration and maintenance of buildings of historical interest in Sheffield.

Activities

The charity is funded via its three wholly owned subsidiaries, Sheffield International Venues Ltd, Sheffield City Hall Limited and Sheffield Festival Limited. It operates the following venues:

 Ponds Forge International Sports Centre
 Sheffield Arena (managed by Live Nation)
 Don Valley Stadium
 iceSheffield
 English Institute of Sport, Sheffield (venue management only)
 Woodbourn Road Athletics Centre
 Tinsley Park Golf Course
 Beauchief Golf Course
 Birley Wood Golf Course
 Concord Sports Centre
 Hillsborough Leisure Centre
 Sheffield City Hall (managed on a 99-year lease from Sheffield City Council)

The trust always plays significant roles in the Race for Life events and the Sheffield Half Marathon.

Finance
In 2005–6 the Trust had an income of £56.7 million, expenditure of £55.8 million and held assets valued at £316 million. It is one of the 100 largest UK charitable organisations ranked by annual expenditure. The current chair of the Trust is David Grey, the previous chair was Howard Culley and before that (1997-2008) was Paul Blomfield.

References

External links
 
 

Charities based in Sheffield
1988 establishments in England